Protein diaphanous homolog 1 is a protein that in humans is encoded by the DIAPH1 gene.

Function 

This gene is a homolog of the Drosophila diaphanous gene and belongs to the protein family of the formins, characterized by the formin homology 2 (FH2) domain. It has been linked to autosomal dominant, fully penetrant, nonsyndromic low-frequency progressive sensorineural hearing loss. Actin polymerization involves proteins known to interact with diaphanous protein in Drosophila and mouse. It has therefore been speculated that this gene may have a role in the regulation of actin polymerization in hair cells of the inner ear. Alternatively spliced transcript variants encoding distinct isoforms have been found for this gene.

Interactions 

DIAPH1 has been shown to interact with RHOA.

Clinical significance

Mutations in this gene have been associated with macrothrombocytopenia and hearing loss,  microcephaly, blindness, and early onset seizures

Its actions on platelet formation appear to occur at the level of the megakaryocyte where it is involved in cytoskeleton formation.

See also 
 mDia1

References

Further reading

External links 
  GeneReviews/NCBI/NIH/UW entry on Deafness and Hereditary Hearing Loss Overview
DIAPH1 Info with links in the Cell Migration Gateway